Mario Pablo Risso Caffiro (born January 31, 1988) is a Uruguayan footballer who plays for Montevideo Wanderers as a centre-back.

References

External links
ascensomx.net

1988 births
Living people
Uruguayan footballers
Uruguayan expatriate footballers
Association football defenders
Footballers from Montevideo
Defensor Sporting players
Botafogo de Futebol e Regatas players
Clube Náutico Capibaribe players
Club Atlético Huracán footballers
Club Celaya footballers
Club Plaza Colonia de Deportes players
Club Nacional de Football players
Montevideo Wanderers F.C. players
Uruguayan Primera División players
Campeonato Brasileiro Série B players
Argentine Primera División players
Ascenso MX players
Uruguayan expatriate sportspeople in Argentina
Uruguayan expatriate sportspeople in Brazil
Uruguayan expatriate sportspeople in Mexico
Expatriate footballers in Argentina
Expatriate footballers in Brazil
Expatriate footballers in Mexico